Alexander Schmid (born 9 June 1994) is a German World Cup alpine ski racer and 2023 World champion in parallel giant slalom. His older brother is another alpine skier Manuel Schmid, who specialised in the speed disciplines.

Career 
Alexander specializes in giant slalom. Born in Oberstdorf, Bavaria, he has competed in two Winter Olympics and three World Championships. Alexander won gold in parallel giant slalom at 2023 World Ski Championships by holding off Austria's Dominik Raschner by .50 seconds.

World Cup results

Season standings

Race podiums
 0 wins
 3 podiums – (1 GS, 2 PG); 13 top tens

World Championship results

Olympic results

References

External links

Alexander Schmid at the Deutscher Skiverband 

1994 births
Living people
Alpine skiers at the 2018 Winter Olympics
Alpine skiers at the 2022 Winter Olympics
German male alpine skiers
Olympic alpine skiers of Germany
People from Oberstdorf
Sportspeople from Swabia (Bavaria)
Medalists at the 2022 Winter Olympics
Olympic medalists in alpine skiing
Olympic silver medalists for Germany
21st-century German people